Bob Nyanja is a Kenyan filmmaker.  He is known for directing the film Malooned! (2007).  He also directed the films The Rugged Priest (2011) and The Captain of Nakara (2012).  Nyanja is also the chairman of the Kenyan Film and Television Producers Association.

Filmography
Malooned! (2007)
The Rugged Priest (2011)
The Captain of Nakara (2012)

References

External links
 

Living people
Kenyan film directors
Year of birth missing (living people)